Shaadi Mubarak is a 2021 Indian Telugu-language romantic comedy film directed by Padmasri and starring Sagar and Drishya Raghunath.

The film was released on 5 March 2021.

Plot
Madhav, an introverted software employee who gets compelled to meet 3 brides of alliances arranged by a marriage bureau run by Jayamma. Bhanumati, daughter of Jayamma, a happy, go-lucky girl had to accompany Madhav in meeting his set alliances. In the journey, they find love in each other, yet, they don't express it. The story takes new turns with each alliance they meet.

Cast 
Sagar RK Naidu as Sunnipenta Madhav 
Drishya Raghunath as Sathyabhama 
Banerjee
Priyadarshini Ram
RJ Hemanth
Rahul Ramakrishna
Shatru
Ajay Ghosh
Rajashree
Bhadra
Hema

Reception 
A critic from The Indian Express wrote that "It is the film’s simple take on life and love that makes it an entertaining watch. The film doesn’t take itself or its subject too seriously, keeping it light and frothy at all times". A critic from Pinkvilla wrote that "This is a road film minus the usual 'Life is best enjoyed away from the daily routine' cliches". A critic from 123telugu said that "On the whole, Shaadi Mubarak is a partly entertaining romantic comedy. There’s enough comedy for entertainment seekers and the chemistry between the lead actors is quite good".

References

2021 films
2020s Telugu-language films
Indian romantic comedy films